Santa María (F81) is the lead ship of six Spanish-built s, based on the American  design, of the Spanish Navy.

Construction and career 
Laid down on 22 May 1982 and launched on 11 November 1984, the Santa María was commissioned into service on 12 October 1986.

All of these Spanish frigates have the length of the later Oliver Hazard Perry frigates, and have a wider beam than the US Navy design, and therefore able to carry more top weight. Fin stabilizers are fitted.

In the American series J.A.G., Santa Maria was used to depict a fictional US Navy Oliver Hazard Perry-class frigate.  Her Spanish pennant number F81 is clearly visible in a number of shots.

On 8 October 2022 the ship suffered serious fire damage, mainly in the helicopter hangar (empty of aircraft at the time), while berthed at Rota, and delaying participation in the Operation Atalanta anti-piracy patrol off Somalia

Gallery

Other units of class

References

Ships of the Spanish Navy
1984 ships
Santa María-class frigates
Ships built in Spain